Kao Chan-hung (born 3 October 1993) is a Taiwanese Olympic weightlifter and current national record holder.

Career 
He made his debut appearance at the Asian Games representing Chinese Taipei at the 2018 Asian Games and competed in the men's 62kg event. In April 2021, he set the new Taiwanese record in men's snatch event during the 2020 Asian Weightlifting Championships.

He represented Chinese Taipei at the 2020 Summer Olympics which was also his debut appearance at the Olympics and competed in the men's 61kg event.

References

External links 
 

1993 births
Living people
Taiwanese male weightlifters
Weightlifters at the 2018 Asian Games
Weightlifters at the 2020 Summer Olympics
Olympic weightlifters of Taiwan
Asian Games competitors for Chinese Taipei
Cheng Shiu University alumni
Sportspeople from Kaohsiung
20th-century Taiwanese people
21st-century Taiwanese people